The Fort Lee lane closure scandal, also known as the George Washington Bridge lane closure scandal or Bridgegate, is a U.S. political scandal in which a staff member and political appointees of New Jersey Governor Chris Christie, a Republican, colluded to create traffic jams in Fort Lee, New Jersey, by closing lanes at the main toll plaza for the upper level of the George Washington Bridge. The closures were intended to embarrass or anger Fort Lee Mayor Mark Sokolich, a Democrat, who had not supported Christie politically.

Three people were eventually charged by Paul J. Fishman, the United States Attorney for the District of New Jersey. A Port Authority of New York and New Jersey (PANYNJ) official, David Wildstein, pleaded guilty in the case and is cooperating with prosecutors. Bill Baroni, the former deputy executive director of the PANYNJ, and Bridget Anne Kelly, former deputy chief of staff to Governor Christie, were charged with conspiracy and fraud and entered pleas of not guilty.

Fishman also compiled a list of unindicted co-conspirators, parties who were aware of the closures at the time they took place or involved in a possible cover-up but who were not charged, which was not made public. The release of the names of so-called co-conspirators has been a matter of controversy in and of itself. and was taken up by Judge Susan Davis Wigenton of the United States District Court for the District of New Jersey and United States Court of Appeals for the Third Circuit. While the names have been made available to attorneys, they have not been made public pending proceedings. Another list, of others "who may have had knowledge of the conspiracy or took actions that happened to further its goals" but did not join the conspiracy, came to light in judicial proceedings in March 2016. Despite the release of some documents after the trial the names of unindicted co-conspirators were not released.

In testimony given in September 2016, Wildstein said that among those who knew of the lane closures either before or while they were taking place or were made aware of attempts at a cover-up were Governor Christie, political advisors Bill Stepien and Michael DuHaime, and PANYNJ staff David Samson, Pat Schuber, and Philip Kwon.

Key people

Legal representation for key people and organizations

New Jersey Legislative Select Committee on Investigation
On January 21, 2014, Assemblyman John S. Wisniewski and State Senate majority leader Loretta Weinberg, whose district includes Fort Lee, announced that the Senate and Assembly committee investigating the matter would merge into the bi-partisan joint New Jersey Legislative Select Committee on Investigation, which they would co-chair and would have 12 members. While the committee initially focused on the Bridgegate scandal, it had the power to investigate other allegations against the Christie administration. On January 24, 2014  the members of the bi-partisan committee were announced; eight Assembly representatives, including five Democrats and three Republicans, and four Senators, including three Democrats and one Republican. At the time, 40% of the members of the New Jersey Legislature were Republican. Besides the two Democratic co-chairs, members included Assemblywoman Marlene Caride (D-Bergen), Assemblyman Michael Patrick Carroll (R-Morris), Senator Nia Gill (D-Essex), Senator Linda Greenstein (D-Middlesex), Assembly Majority Leader Louis Greenwald (D-Camden), Assemblywoman Amy Handlin (R-Monmouth), Assemblywoman Valerie Huttle (D-Bergen), Assemblywoman Holly Schepisi (R-Bergen), Assemblywoman Bonnie Watson Coleman (D-Mercer), and an unnamed Republican Senator. On January 27, both houses voted unanimously to combine the investigations, maintaining the partisan balance, and announced Kevin O'Toole's (R-Essex) inclusion despite his mention in a December 5 email from Wildstein to Michael Drewniak. Assemblyman Paul D. Moriarty (D-4th Legislative) District subsequently replaced Watson.

United States Attorney for the District of New Jersey
In some cases the United States Attorney for the District of New Jersey asked the Legislative Select Committee on Investigation to delay in calling witnesses in connection with its own investigations in the lane closures and other matters.

Governor's Office staff subpoenaed by the Joint Legislative Committee

Christie for Governor and  campaign associates subpoenaed by the Joint Legislative Committee

PANYNJ officials invited to testify/subpoenaed by the NJ Legislature committees

See also
 Governorship of Chris Christie
 Deborah Gramiccioni
 Bill Brennan (activist)

References

Port Authority of New York and New Jersey people
Political scandals in New Jersey
Political scandals in New York (state)
Lists of people by association
21st-century American people
2010s-related lists
New Jersey-related lists
United States politics-related lists
Lists of American people
Lists of political scandals